Nude model, nude modelling, adult model, or erotic model may refer to:

Model (art), a model who poses for any visual artist as part of the creative process
Model (person), a person with a role to promote, display, or advertise commercial products
Fetish model, a person who models fetish clothing or devices 
Erotic photography model, a model who poses nude for erotic or sensual photos

See also 
Depictions of nudity
Erotic photography
Glamour photography
Nude (art)
Nude photography
Nude photography (art)
Nudity
List of glamour models